Dr George B. Johnson (born 11 June 1942, in Newport News, Virginia) is a science educator who for many years has written a weekly column "On Science" in the St. Louis Post-Dispatch. For over 30 years he was a biology professor at Washington University and a genetics professor at Washington University School of Medicine. He has authored 44 scientific papers and ten high school and college biology texts. Over 3 million students have learned biology from these texts.

Education
Johnson got his B.A. in English from Dartmouth College in 1964, and his M.A. in biology, also at Dartmouth College in 1966.

He was granted his Ph.D. in population biology from Stanford University in 1972, his thesis being on genetic variation in alpine butterflies.

Academic career
Johnson was hired as an assistant professor of biology at Washington University in St. Louis in 1972.  He was a visiting research fellow at Carnegie Institution of Washington, Department of Plant Biology, Stanford, California, 1975-1976. He was promoted to associate professor of biology at Washington University in St. Louis and also associate professor of genetics at their School of Medicine in 1976. He served as visiting lector, Genetisk Institute at Aarhus University, Aarhus, Denmark, in 1977.

In 1980 he was promoted to professor of biology at Washington University, a position he held until his retirement in 2004. He was also professor of genetics at the School of Medicine from 1981 to 2004. During the years 1987 to 1990 he served as founding director of The Living World education center, St. Louis Zoo.

Since 2004 he has continued at Washington University as professor emeritus of biology.

Writings

Research publications
 Wild type and mutant stocks of Aspergillus nidulans, (with R.W. Barratt and W.N. Ogata), 1965, Genetics 52: 233-234
 Purification and characterization of glutamic acid dehydrogenase from Escherichia coli strain K-12. Master's thesis, Dartmouth College, 1966
 Analysis of enzyme variation in natural populations of the butterfly Colias eurytheme, 1971, Proc. Natl. Acad. Sci. USA 68: 997-1001
 The relationship of enzyme polymorphism to metabolic function, 1971, Nature 232: 347-348
 The selective significance of biochemical polymorphism in Colias butterflies, Doctoral dissertation, Stanford University, 1972
 Enzyme polymorphisms: Evidence that they are not selectively neutral, 1972, Nature New Biology 237: 170-171
 The relationship of enzyme polymorphism to species diversity, 1973, Nature 242: 193-194
 Enzyme polymorphism and biosystematics: The hypothesis of selective neutrality, 1973, Annual Review of Ecology and Systematics, 4: 93-116
 The importance of substrate variability to enzyme polymorphism, 1973, Nature New Biology 243: 1 51-153
 On the hypothesis that polymorphic enzyme alleles are selectively neutral. I. The evenness of allele frequency distribution, (with M.W. Feldman), 1973, Theor. Pop. Biol. 4: 209-221
 Enzyme polymorphism and metabolism, 1974, Science 184: 28-37
 On the estimation of effective number of alleles from electrophoretic data, 1974, Genetics 78: 771-776
 Studying genetic variation in human populations, 1974, Jour. Heredity 65: 260-261
 The use of internal standards in electrophoretic surveys of enzyme polymorphism, 1975, Biochemical Genetics 13: 833-847
 Enzyme polymorphism and adaptation, 1975, Stadler Genetics Symposium 7: 91-116
 Mechanisms of evolution and speciation, 1975, In Life: The Individual and the Species (T. Lane, Ed.). Mosby Publishing Company, St. Louis, Missouri.
 Polymorphism and predictability at the alpha-glycerophosphate dehydrogenase locus in Colias butterflies: Gradients in allele frequencies within a single population, 1976, Biochemical Genetics 14: 403-426
 Genetic polymorphism and enzyme function, 1976, In The Molecular Study of Biological Evolution, Chapter 3, pp. 46–59 (F. Ayala, Ed.), Sinauer Associates, Inc., Sunderland, Massachusetts.
 Hidden alleles at the alpha-glycerophosphate dehydrogenase locus in Colias butterflies, 1976, Genetics 83: 149-167
 Enzyme polymorphism and adaptation in Alpine butterflies, 1976, In Evolution Within Populations, Ann. Mo. Bot. Garden 63: 248-261
 Enzyme polymorphism in the butterfly Colias: Selection on metabolic phenotypes, 1976, Carnegie Institution of Washington Yearbook 75: 440- 449
 Characterization of electrophoretically hidden variation in the butterfly Colias, 1976, Carnegie Institution of Washington Yearbook 75: 449-456
 Factors altering the gel sieving behavior of proteins: The effect of deuterium oxide, 1976, Carnegie Institution of Washington Yearbook 75: 456-459
 Evaluation of the stepwise mutation model of electrophoretic mobility: Comparison of the gel sieving behavior of alleles at the esterase-5 locus of Drosophila pseudoobscura, 1977, Genetics 87: 139–157. Abstract: Genetics 83: s36 (1976)
 Characterization of electrophoretically cryptic variation in the alpine butterfly Colias meadii, 1977, Biochemical Genetics 15: 665-693
 Hidden heterogeneity among electrophoretic alleles, 1977, In Measuring Selection in Natural Populations (F. Christiansen, T. Fenchel, Eds.), Springer-Verlag, Berlin: 223-244
 Assessing electrophoretic similarity: The problem of hidden heterogeneity, 1977, Annual Review of Ecology and Systematics, Vol. 8: 309-328
 Isozymes, allozymes, and enzyme polymorphism: Structural constraints on polymorphic variation, 1978, Isozymes: Current Topics in Biological and Medical Research, Vol. 2: 1-21
 Enzyme polymorphism: Metabolic considerations, 1978, Metabolic Therapy, 7: l-4
 Structural flexibility of isozyme variants: Genetic variants in Drosophila disguised by cofactor and subunit binding, 1978, Proc. Natl. Acad. Sci. USA 75: 395–399. Abstract: Genetics 86: s33, (1977)
 Genetically controlled variation in conformation of enzymes, 1979, Prog. Nucleic Acid Res. Molec. Biol. 22: 293-326
 Genetic variation in the physiological phenotype, 1979, In Population Biology of Plants (O. Solbrig, S. Jain, G. Johnson & P. Raven, Eds.), Columbia Univ. Press, N.Y.: p. 62-83
 Genetic polymorphism at enzyme loci, 1979, In Physiological Genetics (J. Scandalios, Ed.), Academic Press, N.Y.: 239-273
 Post-translational modification as a potential explanation of high levels of enzyme polymorphism (with V. Finnerty), 1979, Genetics 91: 695-722
 Gene expression in Drosophila: Characterization of the enzymes produced by certain complementary maroon-like heterozygotes (with V. Finnerty, and M. McCarron), 1979, Molec. Gen. Genet., 172: 37-43
 The genetics of electrophoretic variation: a response (with V. Finnerty), 1979, Genetics 92: 357-360
 Increasing the resolution of polyacrylamide gel electrophoresis by varying the degree of gel cross-linking, 1979, Biochemical Genetics 7: 499-5l6
 Unvermutete Genetische Variation an Enzymorten (with V. Loeschcke), 1979, Biologisches Zentralblatt, 98: 163-173
 Structural vs. post-translational components of genic variation (with V. Finnerty), 1979, Genetics 92: 683-684
 Population Biology of Plants, 1980, Editor (with O. Solbrig, S. Jain & P. Raven), Columbia Univ. Press, N.Y.
 Polyploidy, plants, and electrophoresis (with B. Carr), 1980. In Polyploidy (W. Lewis, Ed.), Academic Press, N.Y.
 Post-translational modification of xanthine dehydrogenase in natural populations of Drosophila melanogaster (with D. Hartl and V. Finnerty). 1981. Genetics 98: 817-831
 Gel sieving electrophoresis: A description of procedures and analysis. In Methods of Biochemical Analysis (D. Glick, Ed.), 1983, Interscience Publishers, New York.
 Phylogenetic Implications of Ribosomal DNA Restriction Site Variation in the Plant Family Onagraceae (with J. Crisci, E. Zimmer, P. Hoch, C. Mudd and N. Pan), 1990, Ann. Mo. Bot. Gard 77: 523-538

Texts
 Biology (with P. Raven and latest edition with Ken Mason and Jonathan Losos and Susan Singer), 1986, 1989, 1992, 1996, 1999, 2002, 2005, 2008, 2011, 2014, 2017, 2020. McGraw-Hill Publishing Company, Dubuque, Iowa.
 Understanding Biology (with P. Raven), 1988, 1991, 1995. Wm. C. Brown Publishing Company, Dubuque, Iowa.
 Environment (with P. Raven and L. Berg) 1993. Saunders Publishing Company, Philadelphia, Pennsylvania.
 Biology Visualizing Life. 1993, 1997. Holt Rinehart Winston, Austin, Texas.
 Human Biology: Concepts and Issues, 1994. W.C. Brown Publishing Co., Dubuque, Iowa.
 Biology: Principles and Explorations, 1995, 2000 (with P. Raven). Holt Rinehart Winston, Austin, Texas.
 How Scientists Think: Key Experiments in Genetics, 1995. W.C. Brown Publishing Company, Dubuque, Iowa.
 The Living World, 1996, 2000, 2003, 2006, 2008, 2010, 2012, 2015, 2018 McGraw-Hill Publishing Company, Dubuque, Iowa.
 Essentials of the Living World, 2006, 2008, 2010, 2013, 2017, 2020 McGraw-Hill Publishing Company, Dubuque, Iowa.
 Understanding Biology (with Ken Mason) 2015, 2018. McGraw-Hill Publishing Company, Dubuque, Iowa.

See also
Biology
Genetics

References

External links
George B. Johnson's homepage

American geneticists
American science writers
Dartmouth College alumni
People from Newport News, Virginia
Science teachers
Stanford University alumni
Washington University in St. Louis faculty
St. Louis Post-Dispatch people
Saint Louis Zoo people
1942 births
Living people
Journalists from Virginia
Scientists from Virginia
Washington University School of Medicine faculty
Academic staff of Aarhus University